The Twin Glacier Camp, also known as the Twin Glacier Lodge and now Taku Glacier Lodge, is a historic wilderness recreation complex in Juneau Borough, Alaska.

It is one of the few surviving camps (out of what was once a large number) established in Alaska during the 1920s.

The camp, comprising 7 contributing buildings, was listed as an historical district on the National Register of Historic Places in 1988.

See also
National Register of Historic Places listings in Juneau, Alaska

References

External links
About the Taku Glacier Lodge

Buildings and structures completed in 1923
Buildings and structures in Juneau, Alaska
Historic districts on the National Register of Historic Places in Alaska
Buildings and structures on the National Register of Historic Places in Juneau, Alaska